Toyfinity is an independent toy company and artist collective. They produce figure kits compatible with Onell Design's Glyos System Series. Several are former lines previously released by Ideal Toy Company. The toys are made of interchangeable parts, and hearken back to the durable, small-scale action figures of the 1980s. The figures can be described as a cross between an Action figure and a Lego set.

History 
Toyfinity toy figures are primarily sold directly by the manufacturer, although on occasion, a release may be made available where a specially decorated figure is available elsewhere. They offer two yearly fan clubs which feature exclusive figures and news.

The company has collaborated with local artists such as Onell Design and David A. White of Mecha Zone.

In 2013, Toyfinity bought the rights to the toy line, Robo Force, from Ideal Toy Company. 

In 2021, The Nacelle Company acquired the rights to the toy line, and announced plans to produce Robo Force toys, books, and branded merchandise. Nacelle, based in Burbank, California, also announced plans to produce a television series in mid-2022. In March 2022, the company revealed the revitalized action figure line created by toy designer, David Vonner.

See also
Micronauts
Designer toys
Kinkeshi

References

External links
 Toyfinity Official Website
 Glyos System Official Blog
 Glyos/Onell Design Forum at October Toys

American artist groups and collectives
Companies based in Camden County, New Jersey
Toy brands
Toy companies of the United States